No Mean City is the tenth studio album by the Scottish hard rock band Nazareth, released in 1979.  The album title comes from the 1935 novel No Mean City and features artwork illustrated by Rodney Matthews. With this record the band's sound was heavier, considering the addition of guitarist Zal Cleminson of The Sensational Alex Harvey Band. It sold very well at the time, with the main single "Star", preceded by "Whatever You Want Babe". The popularity of the album allowed the band to play with several big names such as Thin Lizzy, on their 1978/79 tour. It was their first album since their second release, Exercises in 1972, not to contain at least one cover version.

Track listings

30th anniversary bonus tracks 

Earlier remasters included the song Greens as a bonus track. This is not available on the 30th Anniversary remaster of No Mean City, but is instead found on the same such remaster of Expect No Mercy.

2010 remaster bonus tracks

Personnel

Band members 
 Pete Agnew - bass guitar, backing vocals
 Dan McCafferty - lead vocals
 Manny Charlton - guitars
 Zal Cleminson - guitars
 Darrell Sweet - drums

Charts

Certifications

References

External links 
 Lyrics to songs from No Mean City

Nazareth (band) albums
1979 albums
A&M Records albums
Albums with cover art by Rodney Matthews